Edla Sofia Hjulgrén (née Lundström; 28 June 1875, Kullaa - 21 May 1918, Viipuri) was a Finnish politician. She was married to a sawmill worker. She was a member of the Parliament of Finland from 1913 to 1916, representing the Social Democratic Party of Finland (SDP). During the Finnish Civil War, she sided with the Reds and was made prisoner by White troops on 29 April 1918. She was sentenced to death and shot in Viipuri on 21 May 1918.

References

1875 births
1918 deaths
People from Ulvila
People from Turku and Pori Province (Grand Duchy of Finland)
Social Democratic Party of Finland politicians
Members of the Parliament of Finland (1913–16)
Women members of the Parliament of Finland
People of the Finnish Civil War (Red side)
People executed by Finland by firing squad
20th-century executions by Finland